Allari Ramudu (English: Naughty Ramu) is a 2002 Indian Telugu-language action comedy film which starred N. T. Rama Rao Jr, Nagma, Gajala and Aarthi Agarwal. B. Gopal directed this film. It was dubbed into Hindi as Main Hoon Khuddar in 2007. It was remade in Bangladeshi Bengali as Number One Shakib Khan.

Plot 
Ramu, a servant falls for the beautiful daughter of his mistress, Chamundeswari, who is a business tycoon. After discovering Ramu's feelings for her daughter, Chamundeswari tries to separate them.

Cast
 N. T. Rama Rao Jr as Ramakrishna "Ramu"
 Nagma as Chamundeswari
 Aarthi Agarwal as Mythili
 Gajala as Rukmini
 Naresh as Mythili's father
 K. Viswanath as Ramachandrayya, Ramakrishna's grandfather
 Jaya Prakash Reddy
 Ahuti Prasad
 Paruchuri Venkateswara Rao
 Pavala Syamala
 L. B. Sriram
 Achyuth as Ramu's father
 Raghu Babu as Raghu
 Vizag Prasad
 Rajitha

Soundtrack
The music was composed by R. P. Patnaik and released by Aditya Music.

Reception
Idlebrain wrote "B Gopal dealt the first half well with mass comedy between Nagma and NTR. In the second half B Gopal lost grip over the subject and meandered through scenes that are unnecessarily inserted to glorify the mass image of NTR. The touch of B Gopal is missing in making the mass scenes effective the film". Sify wrote "On the whole director B.Gopal has worked well on NTR?s mass masala image".

References

2002 films
2000s Telugu-language films
2002 action comedy films
Films directed by B. Gopal
Telugu films remade in other languages
Indian action comedy films
2000s masala films
2002 comedy films